Judson is an unincorporated community in Blue Earth County, in the U.S. state of Minnesota.

History
A post office was established at Judson in 1857, and remained in operation until it was discontinued in 1973. Judson was named for a pioneer settler.

References

Unincorporated communities in Blue Earth County, Minnesota
1857 establishments in Minnesota Territory
Populated places established in 1857
Unincorporated communities in Minnesota